David Richenthal is a lawyer and Broadway theater producer. He is the President of Richenthal Productions, Inc. Former companies include Delphi Productions, LLC and Barking Dog Entertainment, Inc.

He has produced I Am My Own Wife (2004 Tony, Puiltzer and Drama Desk Awards for Best New Play); Marc Salem’s Mind Games on Broadway; Long Day's Journey Into Night, directed by Robert Falls, starring Vanessa Redgrave, Brian Dennehy, Philip Seymour Hoffman and Robert Sean Leonard (Tony and Drama Desk Awards for Best Revival of a Play); Arthur Miller's The Crucible, directed by Richard Eyre, starring Liam Neeson and Laura Linney; Arthur Miller's The Price, directed by James Naughton, starring Harris Yulin and Jeffrey DeMunn; Arthur Miller's Death of a Salesman, directed by Robert Falls, starring Brian Dennehy (Tony and Drama Desk Awards for Best Revival of a Play; Tony Awards for Mr. Falls and for Mr. Dennehy); Noël Coward's Present Laughter, starring Frank Langella; the Pulitzer Prize winner The Young Man From Atlanta by Horton Foote, directed by Robert Falls, starring Rip Torn and Shirley Knight; the Pulitzer Prize winner The Kentucky Cycle, directed by Warner Shook, starring Stacy Keach; Mrs. Klein, starring Uta Hagen by Nicholas Wright; Remembrance, starring Milo O'Shea and Frances Sternhagen; Conor McPherson's Dublin Carol by special arrangement with the Atlantic Theater Company; in London co-produced the world premiere of David Mamet's The Cryptogram and Katherine Burger's Morphic Resonance.

He was born in New York on May 15, 1948, the son of Arthur Richenthal, a New York real estate lawyer.

Selected productions
The Kentucky Cycle, which was nominated for a Tony Award but lost 2.2 million dollars for Richenthal.
Present Laughter (Tony nominee)
The Young Man From Atlanta (Tony nominee)
Death of a Salesman (Tony and Drama Desk Award winner)
The Price (Tony winner; Drama Desk nominee)
The Crucible (Tony and Drama Desk nominee)
Long Day's Journey Into Night (Tony and Drama Desk winner)
I Am My Own Wife (Tony and Drama Desk winner)
Marc Salem's Mind Games on Broadway

References

American theatre managers and producers
Living people
Year of birth missing (living people)